Zaman, an Arabic and Hebrew word (زمان or זמן) for time, era, or life may refer to:

Organizations
 Zaman International School, Phnom Penh, Cambodia
 Zaman (newspaper), a Turkish newspaper with international editions
 Today's Zaman, the English-language edition
 Zaman (Cyprus), Turkish Cypriot newspaper

People
 Akram uz-Zaman, Bengali politician in Meghalaya
 Arif Zaman, Pakistani mathematician
 Atiq-uz-Zaman (born 1975), Pakistani cricketer
 Azad Zaman (died 2021), Bengali politician in Meghalaya
 Baby Zaman (1923–2013), Bengali actor and producer
 Badar uz Zaman (born 1940), Pakistani classical musician
 Daulat Zaman (1947–2002), Bengali cricketer
 Dilara Zaman (born 1943), Bangladeshi actress
 Dina Zaman (born 1969), Malaysian writer
 Fakhar Zaman (born 1943), Pakistani poet and novelist
 Fakhar Zaman (cricketer) (born 1990), Pakistani cricketer
 Farhan Zaman, (born 1992), Pakistani squash player
 Farrukh Zaman (born 1956), Pakistani cricketer
 Muhammad Hasan uz-Zaman (1900–1968), Bengali politician and educationist
 Hisham Zaman (born 1975), Kurdish-Norwegian filmmaker
 Mansoor Zaman (born 1980), Pakistani squash player
 Mian Yawar Zaman (born 1961), Pakistani politician
 Mohammed Zaman (1965–2010), Afghan military leader and politician
 Muhammad Zaman (fl. 1680–1700), Persian calligrapher and painter
 Munawwaruz Zaman (1950–1994), Pakistani field hockey player
 Niaz Zaman, Bangladeshi academic
 Qamar Zaman (born 1952), Pakistani squash player
 Qazi Syed Mohammad Zaman (fl. 1722–1756), Indian judge
 Raja Sikander Zaman (1935–2007), Pakistani politician
 Rustam Zaman (fl. 1659), Bijapuri general
 Sabah uz Zaman, Pakistani State Bank officer
 Salman Zaman (born 1979), Bahraini rifle sport shooter
 Shahid Zaman (born 1982), Pakistani squash player
 Tahir Zaman (born 1969), Pakistani field hockey player
 Zaman Molla (born 1979), Iranian table tennis player
 Zaman Shah Durrani (1770–1844), ruler of the Durrani Empire from 1793 to 1800

Places
 Zaman-e Sofla, a village in Kerman Province, Iran
 Zaman Town, a neighborhood of Korangi Town, Karachi, Sindh, Pakistan

Other uses
 Shah Zaman (One Thousand and One Nights), a character in the folk tale One Thousand and One Nights
 Zaman (album), a 2002 album by Lebanese singer Amal Hijazi
 "Zaman" (song)
 Zaman people, one of the Beti-Pahuin ethnic groups of Cameroon

See also
 
 Saman (disambiguation)
 Zama (disambiguation)
 Zman (disambiguation)